Jabalpur Cantonment Assembly constituency is one of the  230 constituencies in the Madhya Pradesh Legislative Assembly of Madhya Pradesh a central state of India. Jabalpur Cantonment is also part of Jabalpur Lok Sabha constituency.

Members of Legislative Assembly
 1967: Manmohandas, Indian National Congress 
 1972: Manmohandas, Indian National Congress
 1977: Dinesh Chand Mishra, Indian National Congress 
 1980: Dinesh Chand Mishra, Indian National Congress 
 1985: Chandra Mohan, Indian National Congress 
 1990: Chandra Mohan, Indian National Congress 
 1993: Ishwardas Rohani, Bharatiya Janata Party
 1998: Ishwardas Rohani, Bharatiya Janata Party
 2003: Ishwardas Rohani, Bharatiya Janata Party
 2008: Ishwardas Rohani, Bharatiya Janata Party
 2013: Ashok Rohani, Bharatiya Janata Party

See also

 Jabalpur Cantonment
 Jabalpur district
 List of constituencies of Madhya Pradesh Legislative Assembly

References

Assembly constituencies of Madhya Pradesh
Jabalpur
Jabalpur district